is a 653.1 metre high Japanese mountain in Sanda, Hyōgo, Japan.
 
Mount Ōfuna is an independent peak in Tamba Highland. This mountain is one of the 50 famous mountains in Hyōgo Prefecture, and visitors can enjoy very wide panorama view around the mountain.

History 
This mountain was one of the important mountains of the enduring ascetic practices for  Shugenja monks. Still there is a small shrine on the top. Near the top of the mountain there was a Buddhist temple, called ‘Ōfunadera’, which was said to be constructed in the 6th century. However the temple moved to the foot of the mountain in 1499. 

Today, visitors can find guideposts with a likeness of Jizō carved in the 14th century on the mountain.

Access
 Tokura Bus Stop of Shinki Bus
 Hazugawa Bus Stop of Shinki Bus

References
 Sanda Tourist Bureau
 Official Home Page of the Geographical Survey Institute in Japan

Ofuna
Shugendō